The Belgian pavilion houses Belgium's national representation during the Venice Biennale arts festivals.

Background

Organization and building 

The Belgian pavilion was the first foreign pavilion built on the Giardini. Architect Léon Sneyers designed the building for its 1907 construction in an art nouveau style with the influence of Josef Hoffmann and Viennese architecture. The pavilion was expanded by A. de Bosschère between 1929 and 1930 with rooms added on both sides of the main exhibition space. He also converted the flat roof from a pitch. Later, the pavilion was twice restored: in 1948 by Virgilio Vallot, who also made its façade concave with rosette motifs, and in 1997 by Georges Baines, who converted the space to a white cube gallery.

Representation by year

Art 

 1948 — Louis Buisseret, James Ensor, Constant Permeke, Louis Van Lint
 1958 — Jules Lismonde (winner of the Renato Carrain Prize)
 1964 — Vic Gentils
 1972 — Pierre Alechinsky and Christian Dotremont
 1988 — Guillaume Bijl, Narcisse Tordoir and Laurent Busine, (curator : Jan Hoet )
 1990 — Among Others, shared exhibition I.C.W the  pavilion of the Netherlands
 1993 — Jan Vercruysse (curator : Jan Debbaut)
 1995 — Didier Vermeiren, (curator : Jan Hoet )
 1997 — Thierry de Cordier
 1999 — Michel François, Ann Veronica Janssens
 2001 — Luc Tuymans
 2003 — Sylvie Eyberg, Valérie Mannaerts
 2005 — Honoré d'O
 2007 — Éric Duyckaerts, Berlinde de Bruyckere
 2009 — Jef Geys (Curator: Dirk Snauwaert)
 2011 — Angel Vergara, Luc Tuymans
 2013 — Berlinde de Bruyckere (Curator: J.M. Coetzee)
 2015 — Vincent Meessen and guests (Mathieu K. Abonnenc, Sammy Baloji, James Beckett, Melle Nieling, Elisabetta Benassi, Patrick Bernier & Olive Martin, Tamar Guimarães & Kasper Akhøj, Maryam Jafri, Adam Pendleton) (Curator: Katerina Gregos)
 2017 — Dirk Braeckman (Curator: Eva Wittocx)
 2019 — Jos de Gruyter & Harald Thys (Curator: Anne-Claire Schmitz)
 2022 — Francis Alÿs (Curator: Hilde Teerlinck)

References

Bibliography

Further reading

External links 

 

National pavilions
Belgian contemporary art